Goddess is the debut studio album by American singer and songwriter Banks, released on September 5, 2014, by Harvest Records. The album includes songs from her previous extended plays Fall Over and London. The album spawned four singles: "Warm Water", "Brain", "Drowning", and "Beggin for Thread". A companion remix album, Goddess Remixes, was released digitally on March 23, 2015.

Background
In February 2014, Banks mentioned that her then-untitled debut studio album was nearing completion; she commented, "I feel like I still have a few more things to let out so that I'll feel really comfortable and happy with my first album being released." In April, Banks announced that the album would be titled Goddess, and confirmed that it would be released on September 9, 2014 in the United States.

Singles
"Warm Water" was released as the lead single from Goddess on May 27, 2013. "Brain" was released as the second single from the album on January 29, 2014. The album's third single, "Drowning", was released on June 9, 2014, peaking at number 48 on the US Rock Digital Songs chart. On July 22, 2014, "Beggin for Thread" was released as the fourth and final single from the album. The song reached number 11 on the US Alternative Songs chart, reached number 64 in Germany, and number 80 in Australia.

Other songs
"Change" and "Alibi" were released as promotional singles from the album in the United Kingdom on February 9 and September 8, 2014, respectively. "Waiting Game" reached number 16 on the Alternative Digital Songs chart and number 31 on the Pop Digital Songs chart in the United States, while peaking at number 99 on the UK Singles Chart.

Tour
Before announcing Goddess, Banks toured with Canadian singer The Weeknd in 2013, for whom she was the opening act. In May 2014, it was announced that she would embark on her first headlining concert tour, which visited North America during May and June.

Critical reception

Goddess received generally positive reviews from music critics. At Metacritic, which assigns a normalized rating out of 100 to reviews from mainstream publications, the album received an average score of 74, based on 22 reviews. Miles Raymer of Entertainment Weekly commended Banks for her "sonic ambition and willingness to risk alienating a pop audience with Goddess gloomy, tweaky beats". Tshepo Mokoena of The Guardian noted that Banks "lays her emotions bare, at times almost embarrassingly so, sounding raw and vengeful when she belts—and a bit like Fiona Apple in the chirr of her upper vocal register", concluding that although the songs "Someone New" and "Under the Table" "sink into nondescript ballad territory", Goddess is otherwise an "accomplished debut". Felicity Martin of Clash expressed that Banks' "Aaliyah-like vocals pour from Goddess, while a gang of bleeding-edge underground producers ... concoct soulful beats to cushion them", adding that "her confessional appeal is not lost ... as ballads such as 'Under The Table' hark back to her humble piano-and-voice origins."

El Hunt of DIY called the album a "bewitching, and surprisingly diverse debut" and stated that "it looks like Jillian Banks more than lives up to the hype." Will Hermes of Rolling Stone found that the album "confirms a beguiling, diaristic voice that echoes avant-pop forebears (Aaliyah, Fiona Apple, Kate Bush) and a taste for gloomy, synth-centric productions." Slant Magazines Sal Cinquemani viewed Banks' "attempts at balladry" as "generally forgettable", but opined that she "excels ... at fusing her pop sensibility with imposing synth pads and hip-hop beats". The Observers Kitty Empire described the album as "slow-burning, fidgety, attractively troubled" and wrote that it "offer[s] up a more conventional take on [minimal R&B] than Banks's British counterpart, FKA Twigs." Despite praising songs such as "Brain" and "Beggin for Thread", Rhian Daly of NME felt that the album is "good, but not up to the standard its title suggests." In a mixed review, Andrew Ryce of Pitchfork commented that "there are moments where [Banks] sounds unpretentious and charming", while dismissing her aesthetic as "all trendy misery assisted by equally fashionable producers, without any substance to hold it all up." He continued, "Banks could certainly go places—but Goddess doesn't, and instead seems content to wallow in the same depressive rut for an exhausting 59 minutes."

Accolades
Slant Magazine placed Goddess at number eight on its list of "The 25 Best Albums of 2014", with Annie Galvin commenting, "The alt-pop landscape in 2014 was crowded with sultry female singers backed by über-hip electronic beatscapes, yet Jillian Banks managed to rise above the fray with her debut." Rolling Stone named it the 17th best R&B album of 2014, and the magazine's Cady Drell wrote, "More than just an Internet sensation with on-the-nose Nineties R&B throwback hooks, L.A. native Jillian Banks can go from gloomy trance cuts one minute to lyrically explicit soul jams the next—all with an impressively modern gothic touch." It was also listed as the 24th best album of the year by The Guardian.

PopMatters ranked the album number 28 on its year-end list and concluded, "[Banks] is no Beyoncé, but her failures are her strength and our gain, and her scars give Goddess a beauty and a feminist wisdom that the platinum features of Beyoncé will never have." Jessica Goodman and Ryan Kristobak of HuffPost included the album on their list of "The 23 Best Albums of 2014", stating, "While exhilarating in bits, as a full listen, [the album is] a little hard to stomach. However, in the comedown, 'Brain' demonstrates what happens when Banks is at her spiciest, and 'You Should Know Where I'm Coming From' removes the ooze for a clear look at just how capable her voice is on its own, giving us hope for a more explorative follow-up."

Commercial performance
Goddess debuted at number 12 on the US Billboard 200, selling 25,000 copies in its first week. By September 2016, it had sold 120,000 copies in the United States. The album debuted at number 20 on the UK Albums Chart with first-week sales of 3,977 copies.

Track listing

Notes
  signifies a co-producer
  signifies an additional producer
  signifies a remixer

Personnel
Credits adapted from the liner notes of the deluxe edition of Goddess.

Musicians
 Banks – vocals
 Edmund Finnis – string arrangements 
 The Section Quartet 
 Daphne Chen – violin
 Eric Gorfain – violin
 Lauren Chipman – viola
 Richard Dodd – cello
 Justin Parker – piano

Technical

 Sohn – production, mixing 
 Daniel Moyler – engineering 
 Lil Silva – production, mixing ; recording ; engineering 
 Shlohmo – production 
 Henry Laufer – recording 
 Cassian – mixing, mastering 
 Jamie Woon – production 
 Totally Enormous Extinct Dinosaurs – production, mixing ; recording ; engineering 
 Tim Anderson – co-production ; additional production ; production, recording ; mixing 
 Justin Parker – co-production 
 Chris Spilfogel – engineering 
 Al Shux – production, recording, mixing 
 Jesse Rogg – production ; mixing ; recording 
 Trevor McFedries – executive production
 Pete Lyman – mastering

Artwork
 Studio Moross – design
 Barnaby Roper – photography

Charts

Weekly charts

Year-end charts

Certifications

Release history

Notes

References

2014 debut albums
Albums produced by Al Shux
Banks (singer) albums
Harvest Records albums